Basquiat: Rage to Riches is a documentary film about artist Jean-Michel Basquiat that premiered on BBC Two in October 2017. It was produced and directed by David Shulman. The film won the Huw Wheldon Award for Specialist Factual at the 2018 British Academy Television Awards.

The documentary aired in the U.S. on PBS as part of its American Masters series in September 2018. It won the New York Press Club Award for Feature Video on TV, and received a nomination for Outstanding Independent Documentary at the 2019 Black Reel Awards.

Synopsis 
Nearly 30 years after his premature death, one of Jean-Michel Basquiat's Skull paintings from 1982 sold at Sotheby's for the record-breaking sum of $110 million. Basquiat: Rage to Riches details how the self-taught Brooklyn-born artist rose to success in the international art marketplace. In addition to interviews with Basquiat's art dealers and associates, the film features exclusive interviews with his two sisters, Lisane Basquiat and Jeanine Basquiat, who have never before spoken about their brother or his art for a documentary.

Cast 

 Jean-Michel Basquiat (archive footage) 
 Lisane Basquiat 
 Jeanine Basquiat 
 Bruno Bischofberger
 Mary Boone
 Bob Colacello
 Tamra Davis
 Brett De Palma
 Fab 5 Freddy
 Larry Gagosian
 Michael Holman
 Suzanne Mallouk
 Cathleen McGuigan
 Annina Nosei
 Paige Powell
 Kenny Scharf
 Troy Stevenson-House (young Basquiat)
 Robert Storr
 Jennifer Vonholstein

References

External links 

 Basquiat: Rage to Riches on BBC Studios
 Basquiat: Rage to Riches on PBS

2017 documentary films
2018 documentary films
American Masters films
BBC television documentaries
Documentary films about painters
Jean-Michel Basquiat